Apollon was a Formula One racing car constructor from Switzerland. The team participated in one Formula One World Championship Grand Prix but failed to qualify. The team was formed by racing driver Loris Kessel.

Formula One
After Loris Kessel had left John Macdonald's RAM team, he approached Frank Williams for a drive at his team. Williams had no place left for Kessel, but could sell him an old car, the FW03. Kessel agreed and approached the Swiss Jolly Club of Switzerland, that was successful in touring cars and rallying. Kessel also hired ex-Ferrari designer Giacomo Caliri. In his FLY-studio the FW03 was heavily updated. The result was a car with a striking long nose and radiators placed directly in front of the front wheel suspension. Painted in fresh yellow and white colours the former FW03 was a nice looking car. The car was renamed the Apollon Fly, named after the sponsor of the project, a pharmacist. However, it took a long time before the Apollon actually appeared on the track. Jolly Club tried to race in Belgium, France, Austria and the Netherlands. However, in Belgium and France, Kessel had transport problems. At Monza the Apollon finally appeared. Because not enough pit boxes were available, the Swiss had to settle for a place in the open air, a clumsy scene. In the untested car Kessel was way too slow and when he went off track in the final qualifying session, the adventure was finally over.

Complete Formula One World Championship results
(key)

References

External links
 Apollon F1 biography
 Apollon F1 biography at histomobile.com

Formula One constructors
Formula One entrants
Swiss auto racing teams
Swiss racecar constructors
1977 establishments in Switzerland
1977 disestablishments in Switzerland
Auto racing teams established in 1977
Auto racing teams disestablished in 1977